Sabin may refer to:

Places in the United States
 Sabin, Minnesota, a city in Clay County, Minnesota
 Sabin, Portland, Oregon, a neighborhood in Portland, Oregon
Sabin-Schellenberg Center, a technical skills center for the North Clackamas School District in Milwaukie, Oregon
 Sabin, Wisconsin, an unincorporated community in the town of Sylvan, Wisconsin
Sabin Point Light, a lighthouse in Rhode Island
Sabin-Wheat Farm, a historic farmstead in Putney, Vermont

Places elsewhere
Sabin Etxea, the official headquarters of the Basque Nationalist Party

Other
 Sabin (given name)
 Sabin (surname)
 Sabin Stakes, American Thoroughbred horse race held in Hallandale Beach, Florida
 Sabin strains, polio vaccine variants developed by Albert Sabin
Sabin–Feldman dye test, a serologic test to diagnose for toxoplasmosis
Doo–Sabin subdivision surface in computer graphics
 Sabin (unit), a unit of sound absorption
 Sabin Figaro, fictional character in the video game Final Fantasy VI

See also
 Sabine (disambiguation)
 Saidhbhín